Hardball, in English, more specifically American English, generally refers to baseball (as opposed to its variant softball), especially when played very competitively. Metaphorically, it refers to uncompromising and ruthless methods or dealings, especially in politics.

Computers
 Hardball, a computer game made for the Palm OS and similar to Breakout
 HardBall!, a series of computer games about baseball

Films
 Hardball (film), a 2001 film with Keanu Reeves and Diane Lane
 Hardball (soundtrack), a soundtrack album from the film
 Hardball, a 1997 film with Tony Curtis

Food
 Hardball, a sugar stage in the making of candy and other confectionery

Literature
 Hardball — How Politics is Played Told By One Who Knows the Game, a book by Chris Matthews, a political talk-show host
 Hardball (comics), a superhero in the Avengers: The Initiative series from Marvel Comics
 Hardball, a comic book series written by Chuck Austen
 Hardball (novel), 2009 detective novel by Sara Paretsky, part of the V. I. Warshawski series

Sports
 Hardball squash, a racquet sport
 Hardball, a type of handball used in Gaelic handball#Types of handball
 , an extreme shooting game utilizing BB guns which fire metal projectiles

Television
 Hardball with Chris Matthews, a talk show on MSNBC hosted by Chris Matthews
 "Hard Ball", an episode of the television series 30 Rock
 Hardball (1989 TV series), a one-season 1989 crime drama television series that aired on NBC
 Hardball (1994 TV series), a 1994 television series, unrelated to the 1989 series, that aired on FOX
 Hardball (2019 TV series), an Australian children's TV series
 Hardball, a BBC One game show hosted by Ore Oduba

Fictional characters
 Hardball, of the alien Bounty Hunters working for Damocles and the Sword in the Gen¹³ comics and the Fire from Heaven crossover.

Other uses
 Hardball (company), a Norwegian investment company.
 Hardball, a slang term used for full metal jacket bullet pistol ammunition, particularly in .45 ACP caliber
 Hardball (G.I. Joe), a fictional character in the G.I. Joe universe